Davenport is a federal electoral district in Toronto, Ontario, Canada, that has been represented in the House of Commons of Canada since 1935.

Demographics
The Davenport riding has the highest percentage of ethnic Portuguese of all Canadian federal ridings (27.4%), and the highest percentage of European immigrants (28.5%, of whom 25.0% are from Southern Europe, and 19.2% from Southern European countries other than Italy), in all of Canada. It also has the highest percentage of native speakers of Portuguese (20.7%) and of Romance languages other than the French language of Canada (32.0%, with many Italian and Spanish). The same holds true for home language (Portuguese: 14.0%; non-French Romance languages: 21.2%, both Canadian riding records)

''According to the Canada 2021 Census; 2013 representation

Ethnic groups: 65.2% White, 6.8% Black, 5.9% Latin American, 5.3% Chinese, 4.6% South Asian, 3% Filipino, 2.3% Southeast Asian, 1.2% Indigenous
Languages: 54.2% English, 14.3% Portuguese, 4.9% Spanish, 3.4% Italian, 2.3% Yue, 1.6% Vietnamese, 1.5% French, 1.3% Tagalog, 1.1% Mandarin
Religions: 48.2% Christian (35.6% Catholic, 1.9% Christian Orthodox, 1.3% Anglican), 40.5% No religion, 3.4% Jewish, 3% Muslim, 2.3% Buddhist, 1.4% Hindu 
Median income (2020): $40,400 
Average income (2020): $55,550

Geography
The district includes parts of west-end Toronto, and includes the neighbourhoods of Fairbank, Oakwood-Vaughan, St. Clair Gardens, Corso Italia, Dovercourt Village, Bloordale Village, Bloorcourt Village, Brockton Village, the Junction Triangle and the western part of Rua Acores.

History
The federal electoral district was created in 1933 from parts of Parkdale and Toronto Northwest ridings.

The federal riding of Davenport has been one of the most consistently Liberal ridings in Canada over the last century.

In 1958, Progressive Conservative Member of Parliament Douglas Morton was elected. Since then, Liberals Walter Gordon and Charles Caccia (who himself held the seat for nearly 40 years) won the seat by increasing margins, finally culminating in a 17,500-vote majority in 1993. Meanwhile, the opposition parties in the constituency were shifting, and the New Democratic Party candidate beat the Progressive Conservative or Conservative candidate in every election since 1979.

In late 2003, Charles Caccia lost the Liberal nomination for the seat to local city councillor Mario Silva, who then went on to win the election and serve as Davenport's Member of Parliament.

In 2011, Andrew Cash of the New Democratic Party won the seat, becoming the first non-Liberal in 49 years to represent the riding. In 2015, Cash was defeated by Liberal candidate Julie Dzerowicz, who became the first female Member of Parliament for Davenport. Dzerowicz ran for re-election in 2019 and won, again defeating Andrew Cash.

This riding lost a fraction of territory to Toronto—St. Paul's during the 2012 electoral redistribution.

Members of Parliament

This riding has elected the following Members of Parliament:

Election results

See also
 List of Canadian federal electoral districts
 Past Canadian electoral districts

References

 Federal riding history from the Library of Parliament
 Campaign expense data from Elections Canada

Notes

Federal electoral districts of Toronto
Ontario federal electoral districts
1933 establishments in Ontario